Popovka is a rural locality (a selo) in Molchanovsky Selsoviet of Mazanovsky District, Amur Oblast, Russia. The population was 419 as of 2018. There are 3 streets.

Geography 
Popovka is located on the left bank of the Zeya River, 55 km southwest of Novokiyevsky Uval (the district's administrative centre) by road. Molchanovo is the nearest rural locality.

References 

Rural localities in Mazanovsky District